Wieblitz Ernst (1883–1973) was a German naval officer during World War I. He was navigation officer on the  on the day of the scuttling.

Biography 

Ernst Wieblitz was born in Metz, Lorraine, one of the strongest fortress of the German Empire. He was the son of a military doctor. In 1901, aged eighteen, Wieblitz joined the Kaiserliche Marine. He began his training on the training ship Charlotte sailing from the Baltic Sea to the Mediterranean Sea. Promoted to "Oberleutnant" in April 1907, he served as a navigation officer on the gunboat  from 1910 to 1912.

By the outbreak of World War I, Ernst Wieblitz was still serving on board the SMS Dresden as navigation officer. This cruiser was the only ship that managed to evade the British Fleet for a prolonged period during the Battle of the Falkland Islands in December 1914, largely due to his excellent deception tactics. Whilst anchored in Cumberland Bay, Robinson Crusoe Island, the Dresden was trapped and forced to scuttle after fighting a battle there with the British. Wounded during the battle, Wieblitz was taken prisoner and confined at Valparaíso, in Chile in March 1915. Unlike Wilhelm Canaris, who managed to escape in August 1915, Wieblitz stayed prisoner until the end of the war. He was awarded the Iron Cross first class on September 23, 1919.

External links
 Ernst Wieblitz on kleiner-kreuzer-dresden.de

Imperial German Navy personnel of World War I
1883 births
1973 deaths
Military personnel from Metz
People from Alsace-Lorraine
Recipients of the Iron Cross (1914), 1st class
German amputees
East German emigrants to West Germany